Cupidesthes salvatoris, the Salvatore's ciliate blue, is a butterfly in the family Lycaenidae. It is found in Sierra Leone.

Etymology
The species is named for Salvatore Belcastro, one of Claudio Belcastro's two sons.

References

Butterflies described in 2005
Lycaenesthini